Lance Olsen (born October 14, 1956) is an American writer known for his experimental, lyrical, fragmentary, cross-genre narratives that question the limits of historical knowledge.

Biography 

Lance Olsen was born in New Jersey.  He received a B.A. from the University of Wisconsin–Madison (1978, honors, Phi Beta Kappa), an M.F.A. from the Iowa Writers' Workshop (1980), and an M.A. (1982) and Ph.D. (1985) from the University of Virginia. For ten years he taught as associate and then full professor at the University of Idaho; for two he directed the University of Idaho's M.F.A. program. He has also taught at the University of Iowa, the University of Virginia, the University of Kentucky, on summer and semester-abroad programs in Oxford and London, on a Fulbright in Turku, Finland, and at various writing conferences. Since 2007 he has taught experimental narrative theory and practice at the University of Utah. From 2002 to 2018, he served as Chair of the Board of Directors at Fiction Collective Two, or FC2; founded in 1974, FC2 is one of America's best-known ongoing literary experiments and progressive art communities. He was fiction editor at Western Humanities Review from 2007 to 2013. He served as Director of Creative Writing at the University of Utah from 2018 to 2019. Olsen's wife, assemblage-artist Andi Olsen, and he split their time between Connecticut and Utah.

Writing 

Olsen is author of fifteen novels, one hypermedia text, five nonfiction books, five short-story collections, a poetry chapbook, and two anti-textbooks about experimental writing, as well as editor of two collections of essays about innovative contemporary fiction. His short stories, essays, poems, and reviews have appeared in hundreds of journals, magazines, and anthologies, including Conjunctions, Fiction International, Iowa Review, Village Voice, Time Out New York, BOMB, Hotel Amerika, and Best American Non-Required Reading.  He is known for his fictional biographies (examples of historiographic metafiction), such as Nietzsche's Kisses and Head in Flames, for which he does extensive historical research, as well as his work in avantpop, postmodernism, speculative fiction, experimental writing practices, and critifiction (the blending of theory and narrativity in a single text).

The hypermedial version of his novel 10:01, created in collaboration with artist Tim S. Guthrie, was published by the Iowa Review Web in 2005 and included in the Electronic Literature Organization Collection: Volume One. Olsen is a regular participant in the biennial &NOW Festival, a celebration of experimental and innovative writing, and has collaborated with a board member of &NOW, Davis Schneiderman, on a series of short works.

Awards 

In May 2022, Olsen was a fellow at The Rockefeller Bellagio Center on Lake Como, Italy. In the spring of 2018, Olsen taught a seminar on Experimental Forms and delivered two lectures as Chaire des Amériques at the Institut des Amériques de Rennes at the University of Rennes. From May 2015 through April 2016, Olsen was a guest at the DAAD Artists-in-Berlin Program. He was the Mary Ellen von der Heyden Berlin Prize in Fiction Fellow at the American Academy in Berlin from January through May 2013 and the Mellon International Visiting Senior Scholar at Rhodes University in Grahamstown, South Africa, in October 2013. He is a Guggenheim and a two-time N.E.A. fellowship recipient, winner of a Pushcart Prize, and was the governor-appointed Idaho Writer-in-Residence from 1996-1998. His novel Tonguing the Zeitgeist was a finalist for the Philip K. Dick Award, and his work has been translated into Arabic, Croatian, Finnish, German, Italian, Polish, and Turkish.

Bibliography

Novels
Always Crashing in the Same Car (Tuscaloosa, AL: Fiction Collective Two, 2023)
Skin Elegies (Ann Arbor, MI: Dzanc Books, 2021)
My Red Heaven (Ann Arbor, MI: Dzanc Books, 2020)
Dreamlives of Debris (Ann Arbor, MI: Dzanc Books, 2017)
There's No Place Like Time: A Retrospective (Lake Forest, IL: &Now Books, 2016)
Theories of Forgetting (Tuscaloosa, AL: Fiction Collective Two, 2014)
Calendar of Regrets (Tuscaloosa, AL: Fiction Collective Two, 2010)
Head in Flames (Portland, OR: Chiasmus Press, 2009)
Anxious Pleasures: A Novel After Kafka (Emeryville, CA: Shoemaker & Hoard, 2007)
Nietzsche's Kisses (Tallahassee, FL: Fiction Collective Two, 2006)
10:01 (print version: Portland, OR: Chiasmus Press, 2005; hypermedia version: Iowa Review Web 7.2 November 2005)
Girl Imagined by Chance (Tallahassee, FL: Fiction Collective Two, 2002)
Freaknest (La Grande, OR: Wordcraft, 2000)
Time Famine (San Francisco, CA: Permeable Press, 1996)
Burnt (La Grande, OR: Wordcraft, 1996)
Tonguing the Zeitgeist (San Francisco, CA: Permeable Press,1994)
Live from Earth (NY: Available Press/Ballantine Books,1991)

Anti-textbooks
Architectures of Possibility: After Innovative Writing (Washington, D.C.: Raw Dog Screaming Press, 2012)
Rebel Yell: Writing Fiction (San Jose: Cambrian Press, 1998)

Nonfiction
There (Fort Wayne, Indiana: Anti-Oedipus Press, 2014)
In Memoriam to Postmodernism: Essays on the Avant-Pop, co-edited with Mark Amerika (SDSU Press, 1995)
Lolita: A Janus Text (NY: Twayne, 1995)
Surfing Tomorrow: Essays on the Future of American Fiction (Prairie Village: Potpourri, 1995), editor
William Gibson (Mercer Island, WA: Starmont House, 1992)
Circus of the Mind in Motion: Postmodernism and the Comic Vision (Detroit: Wayne State University Press, 1990)
Ellipse of Uncertainty: An Introduction to Postmodern Fantasy (Westport, CT: Greenwood Press, 1987)

Short story collections
How to Unfeel the Dead: New & Selected Fictions (Toronto: Teksteditions, 2014)
Hideous Beauties  (Portland, OR: Eraserhead, 2003)
Sewing Shut My Eyes (Normal/Tallahassee: Fiction Collective Two/Black Ice, 2000)
Scherzi, I Believe (La Grande, OR: Wordcraft, 1994)
My Dates With Franz (Amherst, MA: Bluestone Press, 1993)

References

External links
Keynote (2022) before 53ème Congrès de l’Association Française d’Études Américaines (AFEA)
Interview (2020) with Lance Olsen about My Red Heaven with Brooklyn Rail
Interview (2020) with Lance Olsen with David Naimon on ''Between the Covers'
Interview (2013) with Lance Olsen on NPR's Berlin Journal
Interview (2010) with Lance Olsen about Head in Flames with Rain Taxi
Interview (2006) with Lance Olsen about Nietzsche's Kisses, by The Nietzsche Circle

Science fiction critics
20th-century American novelists
21st-century American novelists
American speculative fiction critics
American male novelists
Postmodernists
National Endowment for the Arts Fellows
Berlin Prize recipients
Poets Laureate of Idaho
University of Wisconsin–Madison alumni
Iowa Writers' Workshop alumni
University of Virginia alumni
Novelists from New Jersey
1956 births
Living people
20th-century American poets
21st-century American poets
American male poets
20th-century American male writers
21st-century American male writers
21st-century American non-fiction writers
American male non-fiction writers
Fulbright alumni